The following is a table of instrumental compositions composed or arranged and recorded by  Tale Ognenovski:

The column  Year lists the year in which the instrumental composition was first recorded.
The column Instrumental composition lists the instrumental composition title.
The column Composer(s) lists who composed the instrumental composition.
The column Arranger(s) lists who arranged the instrumental composition.
The column Date, Album, Record label lists the date of recording, title of the album, catalog of the record label.
 Tale Ognenovski has composed or arranged 300 instrumental compositions: Macedonian folk dances, jazz compositions, and classical concerts 
Labels:
MRT, Macedonian Radio-Television, Republic of Macedonia
PGP-RTB, now PGP-RTS Radio Television of Serbia, Serbia
Jugoton, now Croatia Records, Croatia
IR, Independent Records, USA

Studio recordings

Notes

References

 
 
 
 
 
  
 
 
 
 
 
 
 
 
 
 
 
 
 
 
 
 
 
 
 
 
 
 
 
 
 
 
 
 
 
 
 
 
 
 
 
 
 
 
 
 
 
 
 
 

Ognenovski
Instrumentals
Instrumental music